Bare Mountain may refer to:

 Bare Mountain (Massachusetts), a mountain in the Holyoke Range
 Bare Mountain (New York), a mountain in the Catskills
 Bare Mountain (Nevada), a mountain range in Nye County

See also
Bear Mountain (disambiguation)